Jonathan R. Lyon is an American historian of medieval Europe.  He is a professor of history at the University of Chicago.

Bibliography
 Princely Brothers and Sisters: The Sibling Bond in German Politics, 1100-1250, Cornell University Press, 2012

References

American medievalists
University of Chicago faculty